Michael Haydn's Symphony No. 5 in A major, Perger 3, Sherman 5, MH 63, written in Salzburg in 1763, is the third of twelve symphonies in the key to be mistaken for a symphony by Joseph Haydn (Hob. I:A3).

Scored for 2 oboes, 2 bassoons, 2 horns and strings, in four movements:

Allegro molto
Andante ma non troppo, in E major
Menuetto e Trio (the latter in A minor)
Presto

Discography

Included in Disc 2 of a set of 20 symphonies on the CPO label with Bohdan Warchal conducting the Slovak Philharmonic.

References
 A. Delarte, "A Quick Overview Of The Instrumental Music Of Michael Haydn" Bob's Poetry Magazine November 2006: 16 PDF
 Charles H. Sherman and T. Donley Thomas, Johann Michael Haydn (1737 - 1806), a chronological thematic catalogue of his works. Stuyvesant, New York: Pendragon Press (1993)
 C. Sherman, "Johann Michael Haydn" in The Symphony: Salzburg, Part 2 London: Garland Publishing (1982): lxiv

Symphony 05
Compositions in A major
1763 compositions